{{speciesbox
| name = Boa Vista wall gecko
| image = 
| status = VU
| status_system = IUCN3.1
| status_ref = 
| genus = Tarentola
| species = boavistensis
| authority = Joger, 1993
| synonyms = *Tarentola rudis boavistensis (Joger, 1993)
| synonyms_ref = 
}}
The Boa Vista wall gecko (Tarentola boavistensis) is a species of geckos in the family Phyllodactylidae. The species is endemic to Cape Verde, where it occurs on the island of Boa Vista. The specific name boavistensis refers to the type locality.

SynonymsTarentola rudis boavistensis Vasconcelos, Perera, Geniez, Harris & Carranza, 2012.

References

Further reading
Joger, 1993 : On two collections of reptiles and amphibians from the Cape Verde Islands, with descriptions of three new taxa.'' Courier Forschungsinstitut Senckenberg, vol. 159, p. 437-444

boavistensisi
Endemic vertebrates of Cape Verde
Fauna of Boa Vista, Cape Verde
Reptiles described in 1993
Taxa named by Ulrich Joger